Jasmina Perazić (born 6 December 1960) is a Serbian-American basketball coach and a former basketball player. Perazić was inducted into the Women's Basketball Hall of Fame in 2014. She is the current head coach of Division II Georgian Court University, a member of the Central Atlantic Collegiate Conference (CACC).

Career 
Perazić competed for Yugoslavia in the 1980 and 1984 Summer Olympics. In 2014, she was inducted into Women's Basketball Hall of Fame.

Currently, Perazic is the Head Women's Basketball Coach at Georgian Court University, an NCAA Division II University in Lakewood, NJ. After guiding the Lions to a perfect regular season (7-0) and a CACC regular season title during the COVID-19 shortened 2020–2021 season, Perazic was named the Central Atlantic Collegiate Conference Coach of the Year. The Lions earned the No. 1 seed in the CACC Tournament and advanced to the CACC Finals, their first finals appearance since becoming a Division II member in 2002–2003. GCU earned an at-large bid to the NCAA Division II National Tournament and on March 12, 2021, won the program's first ever game at the East Regional, downing divisional foe Concordia College in the Regional Quarterfinals.

Personal life
Perazić has a daughter, Deanna Gipe (married Marello). Deanna and her wife Erica reside in New Jersey.

Achievements
 2014 Women's Basketball Hall of Fame 
 2008 ACC Tournament Legend                                         
 2002 University of Maryland Athletic Hall of Fame
 1986 MVP Balkan Championships 
 1985 Best Five of Europe
 1984 MVP Pre-Olympic Tournament 
 1983 MVP European Championships
 1983 Most Popular Player at the World Championships, 2nd Leading Scorer of the Tournament
 1983 WBCA Kodak All American
 1983 ACC Tournament MVP
 1982 NCAA West Region All Tournament Team (Inaugural NCAA women's basketball tournament)

Coaching Awards and Accomplishments
 2009 WBCA National Coach of the Year  (District III)
 2010 WCAC Coach of the Year
 2010 Gazette Newspaper Coach of the Year
 2020-2021 CACC Coach of the Year

With Yugoslav National Basketball Team
 1980 Olympic Games Moscow, Russia Bronze Medal
 1983 World Championships São Paulo, Brazil Placed 8th 2nd leading scorer with 17.6PPG Voted Most Popular Player of the Tournament
 1983 World University Games Edmonton, Canada Bronze Medal
 1984 Pre-Olympic Tournament Havana, Cuba MVP
 1984 Olympic Games Los Angeles, United States of America Placed 6th
 1986 Balkan Championships Tuzla, Bosnia and Herzegovina Gold Medal
 1987 European Championships Cadiz, Spain Silver Medal
 1987 World University Games Zagreb Croatia Gold Medal                                                                                                                                           
 MVP 1986 Balkan Championships Tuzla Bosnia and Herzegovina
 MVP 1984 Pre Olympic Tournament Havana, Cuba
 Best Five of Europe and #1 Player in Europe 1983 Hungary, 1985 Italy
 Yugoslavian Cup Winner 1984 with ŽKK Voždovac (Zenski Kosarkaski Klub Vozdovac/Women's Basketball Club Vozdovac), Belgrade, Serbia (formerly Yugoslavian Women's Basketball League)
 1997 New York Liberty, WNBA

See also 
 List of Serbian WNBA players

References
University of Maryland Archives, FiBA Archives, FIBA.com  ACC Tournament Legends, NCAA.com  NCAA All Americans

External links
Hall of Fame profile at wbhof.com
WNBA statistics at basketball-reference.com
Georgian Court University profile at gculions.com

1960 births
Living people
All-American college women's basketball players
Basketball players at the 1980 Summer Olympics
Basketball players at the 1984 Summer Olympics
Maryland Terrapins women's basketball players
Medalists at the 1980 Summer Olympics
Olympic basketball players of Yugoslavia
Olympic bronze medalists for Yugoslavia
Olympic medalists in basketball
Serbian expatriate basketball people in the United States
Serbian expatriate basketball people in Germany
Serbian women's basketball coaches
Serbian women's basketball players
Shooting guards
Small forwards
Basketball players from Novi Sad
Universiade bronze medalists for Yugoslavia
Universiade gold medalists for Yugoslavia
Universiade medalists in basketball
Women's National Basketball Association players from Serbia
Yugoslav women's basketball players
ŽKK Vojvodina players
ŽKK Voždovac players
Medalists at the 1983 Summer Universiade
Medalists at the 1987 Summer Universiade